Hopkins Pond (also known as Adder Pond) is a small pond located at the south foot of Ragged Mountain, in the town of Andover, New Hampshire, United States. The pond is part of Proctor Academy's  campus in Andover and is jointly managed by Proctor and the New Hampshire Fish and Game Department. The pond area is open to the public for non-motorized boat travel, fishing and hiking.

It empties eastward into Mountain Brook below Elbow Pond. Mountain Brook, in turn, is a tributary of the Blackwater River, which flows via the Contoocook River and Merrimack River to the Gulf of Maine (Atlantic Ocean) at Newburyport, Massachusetts.

Hopkins Pond sits within the Merrimack River watershed, and is floristically considered part of the Sunapee Uplands sub-region of the Lower New England-Northern Piedmont Ecoregion, as defined by The Nature Conservancy, and the New England-Acadian Forest Ecoregion, as defined by the World Wildlife Fund.

The north shore of Hopkins Pond can be accessed from the west by Middle Hopkins Pond Trail. The south shore can be accessed from Lower Hopkins Pond Trail. Both shores can be accessed from the east by an NH Fish and Game access road off Elbow Pond Road.

Observed species of fish in the pond include rainbow trout and brook trout.

See also

List of lakes in New Hampshire

References

External links
Hopkins Pond Wiki
Proctor Academy
Merrimack River Watershed Council

Lakes of Merrimack County, New Hampshire
Lakes of New Hampshire